The New Caledonia national under-16 basketball team is a national basketball team of New Caledonia, administered by the Région Fédérale de Nouvelle Calédonie de Basketball.

It represents the country in international under-16 (under age 16) basketball competitions.

See also
New Caledonia men's national basketball team
New Caledonia men's national under-18 basketball team
New Caledonia women's national under-18 basketball team

References

External links
New Caledonia Basketball Records at FIBA Archive

Basketball teams in New Caledonia
Men's national under-16 basketball teams
Basketball